María Teresa Gargallo (born 15 October 1969) is a Spanish racewalker. She competed in the women's 20 kilometres walk at the 2004 Summer Olympics.

References

External links
 

1969 births
Living people
Athletes (track and field) at the 2004 Summer Olympics
Spanish female racewalkers
Olympic athletes of Spain
Place of birth missing (living people)
20th-century Spanish women
21st-century Spanish women